Koral Berkin Kutlu (born 12 October 2005) is a Turkish Paralympic swimmer who competes in international swimming competitions. He is a double World bronze medalist and has competed at the 2020 Summer Paralympics where he reached the final of the 200m freestyle S5 and finished in fifth position. He was born with undeveloped right arm and left leg.

References

2005 births
Living people
Sportspeople from Istanbul
Paralympic swimmers of Turkey
Turkish male freestyle swimmers
Swimmers at the 2020 Summer Paralympics
Medalists at the World Para Swimming Championships
S5-classified Paralympic swimmers
21st-century Turkish people